The Golden Melody Award for Best Vocal Group is an award given by the Ministry of Culture of Taiwan. It was first presented in 1990.

Winners and nominees

Best Vocal Collaboration (1990–2000)

Best Vocal Ensemble (2001-2005)

Best Vocal Collaboration (2006-present)

References

Golden Melody Awards